The Chebotarev theorem on roots of unity was originally a conjecture made by Ostrowski in the context of lacunary series. 

Chebotarev was the first to prove it, in the 1930s. This proof involves tools from Galois theory and pleased Ostrowski, who made comments arguing that it "does meet the requirements of mathematical esthetics".
Several proofs have been proposed since, and it has even been discovered independently by Dieudonné.

Statement 

Let  be a matrix with entries , where . 

Equivalently, all submatrices of a DFT matrix of prime length are invertible.

Applications 
In signal processing, the theorem was used by T. Tao to extend the uncertainty principle.

Notes

References 

Theorems in linear algebra
Theorems in algebraic number theory